Terry McGovern Carpenter (March 28, 1900 – April 27, 1978) was an American politician. Though he changed his party five times, he was elected as a Democrat to the United States House of Representatives and later served 22 years in the Nebraska Legislature. He also unsuccessfully ran for the Senate, Governor and Lieutenant Governor of Nebraska, and also unsuccessfully and then subsequently successfully for mayor of Scottsbluff, Nebraska. Carpenter was also a successful businessman and founded the village of Terrytown, Nebraska.

Early life
Carpenter was born in Cedar Rapids, Iowa on March 28, 1900, the son of Burt and Martha Carpenter. He moved to Scottsbluff in 1916 and was employed in various capacities by a railroad company. From 1922 to 1923 he sold tobacco and candy, moving to Long Beach, California in 1923. There, he was the manager of the municipal gas and water department. He returned to Scottsbluff in 1927 where he worked in the garage business and the retail coal business.

After two brief marriages, Carpenter married Hazeldeane Carruthers on February 1, 1930, and they had three sons: Terry Jr., Gary, and Michael.

Career
Carpenter ran unsuccessfully for mayor of Scottsbluff, Nebraska in 1931, but the next year was elected to the Seventy-third Congress (March 4, 1933 – January 3, 1935) as a Democrat for the 5th District. He did not run for reelection, since he was running for Governor of Nebraska in 1934. Failing to get the Democratic nomination, he next ran for a seat in the U.S. Senate but lost the election, coming in a distant third place with 18% of the vote, as he was running against the incumbent independent Republican George W. Norris and another Republican candidate. Norris won the election.

Carpenter continued to run for various offices unsuccessfully through the 1940s, but was a very successful businessman. He established the only gasoline refinery in Nebraska in Scottsbluff, with his own chain of gas stations in several states which created gas wars wherever they opened. He eventually sold this operation and started several new businesses.

Carpenter was a major in the United States Air Corps from 1942 to 1945 during World War II. He was elected mayor of Scottsbluff in 1947, but later stepped down due to perceived conflicts with his many businesses in the city. He founded a new village on the other side of the river from Scottsbluff in 1949 and called it Terrytown. He based his new businesses there, selling liquor by the drink before Scottsbluff did, starting a radio station, a drive-in movie theater, and two restaurants.

Carpenter changed political affiliation five times, being a delegate to the Republican National Convention in 1956. He was successful in being elected to the state legislature in 1952 and served 22 years as a state senator.

In 1970, Carpenter conducted much-publicized legislative hearings against a gay studies course being offered at UNL. Carpenter considered homosexuality "a terrible disease" and believed that the college course would turn students gay. Carpenter attempted to expose the names of students taking the course. In 1971, he introduced legislation to prohibit courses pertaining to "aberrant" sexuality. It did not pass into law.

During his legislative career, he also operated Terry Carpenter, Inc., in Terrytown. He retired in Scottsbluff, Nebraska where he died April 27, 1978. He is buried in Fairview Cemetery in Scottsbluff.

Campaign failures
Carpenter ran for but failed to be elected to the following offices:

Mayor of Scottsbluff in 1931
nomination for governor in 1934
United States Senate in 1936
lieutenant governor in 1938
governor in 1940
nomination to the United States Senate in 1942
United States Senate in 1948
nomination for governor in 1950
nomination to the United States Senate in 1954
nomination for governor in 1960
United States Senate in 1972
lieutenant governor in 1974

Campaign successes
Carpenter was elected to the following offices:

United States House of Representatives in 1932
Mayor of Scottsbluff in 1947 (but later stepped down)
Nebraska Legislature in 1952 (served through 1974)

References

Sources
 
 
 
 

1900 births
1978 deaths
Politicians from Cedar Rapids, Iowa
People from Scottsbluff, Nebraska
American city founders
Mayors of places in Nebraska
Nebraska Republicans
Nebraska state senators
United States Army Air Forces personnel of World War II
Democratic Party members of the United States House of Representatives from Nebraska
20th-century American politicians
United States Army Air Forces officers
Military personnel from Iowa